Chyzh or Chizh is an East Slavic surname referring to the Eurasian siskin (Spinus spinus). It is equivalent to the Polish surname Czyż and the Czech surname Číž. Notable people with this surname include:

 Aleksandr Chizh (born 1997), Belarusian footballer
 Aleksandr Chizh (footballer, born 2002), Belarusian footballer
 Maksim Chizh (born 1993), Belarusian footballer
 Yury Chyzh (born 1963), Belarusian businessman

See also
 Chizh & Co, Russian rock band

Belarusian-language surnames